The Iloilo Schools Sports Association (High School Basketball) is a sports association of Universities and Colleges in Iloilo City, Philippines. In 2007 Season, it has 11 member schools. At the Opening of School Year 2016-2017, the ISSA Board of Trustees approved the inclusion of CenterPhil Montessori, a private school based in Janiuay, Iloilo, as one of its member-schools. CenterPhil is the first school from Iloilo Province that was approved to join ISSA. ISSA is one of the sports associations affiliated with the Iloilo Sports Council and DepEd for Basketball.

Member schools

Eliminations standing (2007)

Top 4 Advances to Semis

Top 4 Advances to Semis

2007 Semifinals round (Knockout)

Venue: CPU Gymnasium, Jaro Iloilo City

2007 Finals Game(Best-of-3)

References

 
Student sport in the Philippines
Sports in Iloilo